Joray Fruit Rolls are an apricot-based fruit snack produced by Joseph Shalhoub & Son, Inc, founded 1886 by George Shalhoub after immigrating from Lebanon. Joray Fruit Rolls were developed by Louis Shalhoub in the 1970s and have been produced in New York City since then. The fruit roll is a derivative of the Lebanese confection, amardeen, a thick paste made from dried apricots.  Made from real fruit, these fruit leather products are fat-free and kosher.

Flavors 
Joray Fruit Rolls come in 10 different flavors. 
Apricot 
Strawberry
Watermelon
Cherry
Sour Apple
Pineapple
Grape
Fruit Punch
Raspberry
Sour Plum
Orange (discontinued)

Other flavors such as Sour Plum are found at certain times and locations.

References

https://web.archive.org/web/20070807044309/http://www.nypress.com/17/41/food/GabriellaGershenson2.cfm

External links
New York Press Article
Joraycandy.com
Time Out NY article

Brand name snack foods